Kosiorów may refer to the following places in Poland:
Kosiorów, Łódź Voivodeship (central Poland)
Kosiorów, Gmina Wilków in Lublin Voivodeship (east Poland)
Kosiorów, Gmina Łaziska in Lublin Voivodeship (east Poland)